252 (two hundred [and] fifty-two) is the natural number following 251 and preceding 253.

In mathematics
252 is:
the central binomial coefficient , the largest one divisible by all coefficients in the previous line
, where  is the Ramanujan tau function.
, where  is the function that sums the cubes of the divisors of its argument:

a practical number,
a refactorable number,
a hexagonal pyramidal number.
a member of the Mian-Chowla sequence.

There are 252 points on the surface of a cuboctahedron of radius five in the face-centered cubic lattice, 252 ways of writing the number 4 as a sum of six squares of integers, 252 ways of choosing four squares from a 4×4 chessboard up to reflections and rotations, and 252 ways of placing three pieces on a Connect Four board.

References

Integers